Lucky 13 is a 2005 American romantic comedy film directed by Chris Hall and starring Brad Hunt, Harland Williams, Lauren Graham, Sasha Alexander, Debra Jo Rupp, John Doe, Kaley Cuoco and Taryn Manning.

Plot
This film is about Zach Baker and his quest to go back through his past experiences with women so he will have the perfect date with his lifelong friend, Abbey. Abbey would be the thirteenth woman he has gone out with and he hopes she will be "Lucky 13".  The story revolves around Zach asking each woman what he did wrong in their relationship, so as to not make the same mistakes with Abbey. A recurring gag involves Zach throwing objects, representing his past affairs, into a lake. During the course of the film, Zach makes changes to his appearance and demeanor, trying to emulate the advice he gets from his past girlfriends—most of which is contradictory. After much soul-searching, Zach decides to ask Abbey to marry him—a proposal that she turns down in order to move to New York City and pursue her dream of being an artist. Zach eventually comes to realize that his life in the Mid-West is not so bad and he gains a new appreciation for his family and friends.

Cast

External links 

2005 films
2005 romantic comedy films
American romantic comedy films
2000s English-language films
2000s American films